Nana Emmanuel K. Kyei (born 10 January 1998) is an English footballer who plays for Concord Rangers.

Career
Kyei joined the academy at Barnet aged nine, and stayed with the club through to senior level. He made his Football League debut when he started against Crawley Town on the final day of the 2015–16 season. Kyei joined Concord Rangers on loan on 5 November 2018. He then joined Hampton & Richmond Borough on loan on 11 January 2019. Kyei went out on loan for a third time when he joined Potters Bar Town on loan deadline day on 28 March 2019. He was released by the Bees at the end of the 2018–19 season. before joining Maidstone United on 1 July. After 17 appearances, Kyei left Maidstone by mutual consent in December 2019. On 24 December 2019, Kyei signed for Chelmsford City. In February 2020, Kyei returned to Potters Bar Town on a permanent deal. Kyei signed a contract with Hungerford Town for the 2021-22 season. In February 2022 he re-joined Concord Rangers.

Personal life
Kyei was born in England and is of Ghanaian descent.

Career statistics

References

External links

1998 births
Living people
English footballers
English people of Ghanaian descent
Association football midfielders
Barnet F.C. players
Concord Rangers F.C. players
Hampton & Richmond Borough F.C. players
Potters Bar Town F.C. players
Maidstone United F.C. players
Chelmsford City F.C. players
Hungerford Town F.C. players
English Football League players
National League (English football) players
Isthmian League players
Footballers from the London Borough of Hackney
Black British sportspeople